Eleni Ttakka (born 3 March 1996) is a Cypriot footballer who plays as a goalkeeper and has appeared for the Cyprus women's national team.

Career
Ttakka has been capped for the Cyprus national team, appearing for the team during the UEFA Women's Euro 2021 qualifying cycle.

References

External links
 
 
 

1996 births
Living people
Cypriot women's footballers
Cyprus women's international footballers
Women's association football goalkeepers